Bob Kappes is a former American football player and coach. He served as the interim head football coach at Ohio University for one season, in 1978, compiling a record of 3–8. Kappes played college football at Miami University in Oxford, Ohio under head coaches Woody Hayes and Sid Gillman. After graduating from Miami in 1950, Kappes became the head football coach that fall at Western Hills High School in Cincinnati, Ohio.  He remained there until 1958, when he was hired as an assistant football coach at Ohio University. Kappes is the father of Stephen Kappes, the former Deputy Director of the Central Intelligence Agency.

Head coaching record

College

References

Year of birth missing (living people)
Living people
American football centers
Miami RedHawks football players
Ohio Bobcats football coaches
High school football coaches in Ohio